The 1863 Vermont gubernatorial election for governor of Vermont took place on September 1. In accordance with the Republican Party's "Mountain Rule", incumbent Frederick Holbrook was not a candidate for reelection. The Republican nominee was J. Gregory Smith, the Speaker of the Vermont House of Representatives. The Democratic nominee was Timothy P. Redfield, a former member of the Vermont Senate and the Free Soil Party's nominee for governor in 1851. In the general election, the Republican Party's dominance of Vermont politics and government continued, and Smith was easily elected to a one-year term.

Results

References
 

1863
Vermont
Gubernatorial
October 1863 events